North Zealand is one of the 12 multi-member constituencies of the Folketing, the national legislature of Denmark. The constituency was established in 2007 following the public administration structural reform. It consists of the municipalities of Allerød, Egedal, Fredensborg, Frederikssund, Furesø, Gribskov, Halsnæs, Helsingør, Hillerød, Hørsholm and Rudersdal. The constituency currently elects 10 of the 179 members of the Folketing using the open party-list proportional representation electoral system. At the 2022 general election it had 341,544 registered electors.

Electoral system
North Zealand currently elects 10 of the 179 members of the Folketing using the open party-list proportional representation electoral system. Constituency seats are allocated using the D'Hondt method. Compensatory seats are calculated based on the national vote and are allocated using the Sainte-Laguë method, initially at the provincial level and finally at the constituency level. Only parties that reach any one of three thresholds stipulated by section 77 of the Folketing (Parliamentary) Elections Act - winning at least one constituency seat; obtaining at least the Hare quota (valid votes in province/number of constituency seats in province) in two of the three provinces; or obtaining at least 2% of the national vote - compete for compensatory seats.

Election results

Summary

(Excludes compensatory seats)

Detailed

2022
Results of the 2022 general election held on 1 November 2022:

Votes per municipality:<

The following candidates were elected:
 Constituency seats - Mette Abildgaard (C), 11,906 votes; Hans Andersen (V), 7,177 votes; Marianne Bigum (F), 2,823 votes; Jakob Engel-Schmidt (M), 4,252 votes; Steffen W. Frølund (I), 2,120 votes; Fie Hækkerup (A), 5,789 votes; Sophie Løhde (V), 23,583 votes; Henrik Møller (A), 4,218 votes; Matilde Powers (A), 4,221 votes; and Rasmus Stoklund (A), 4,647 votes.
 Compensatory seats - Helene Liliendahl Brydensholt (Å), 1,183 votes; Marlene Harpsøe (Æ), 1,669 votes; Martin Lidegaard (B), 7,167 votes; and Mette Thiesen (D), 4,357 votes.

2019
Results of the 2019 general election held on 5 June 2019:

Votes per municipality:

The following candidates were elected:
 Constituency seats - Mette Abildgaard (C), 18,962 votes; Hans Andersen (V), 13,415 votes; Claus Hjort Frederiksen (V), 13,413 votes; Nick Hækkerup (A), 23,881 votes; Martin Lidegaard (B), 12,703 votes; Sophie Løhde (V), 23,801 votes; Morten Messerschmidt (O), 7,554 votes; Henrik Møller (A), 8,339 votes; Rasmus Stoklund (A), 9,759 votes; and Trine Torp (F), 4,307 votes.
 Compensatory seats - Birgitte Bergman (C), 5,102 votes; Kristian Hegaard (B), 1,945 votes; Mette Thiesen (D), 4,354 votes; and Mai Villadsen (Ø), 4,926 votes.

2015
Results of the 2015 general election held on 18 June 2015:

Votes per municipality:

The following candidates were elected:
 Constituency seats - Pia Adelsteen (O), 14,057 votes; Hans Andersen (V), 9,386 votes; Christine Antorini (A), 18,523 votes; Claus Hjort Frederiksen (V), 16,067 votes; Maria Reumert Gjerding (Ø), 5,167 votes; Nick Hækkerup (A), 26,064 votes; Marlene Harpsøe (O), 15,094 votes; Sophie Løhde (V), 22,560 votes; Anders Samuelsen (I), 29,204 votes; and Pernille Schnoor (A), 9,073 votes.
 Compensatory seats - Mette Abildgaard (C), 6,071 votes; May-Britt Buch-Kattrup (I), 913 votes; Martin Lidegaard (B), 12,477 votes; Jan-Erik Messmann (O), 8,725 votes; Christian Poll (Å), 7,452 votes; and Trine Torp (F), 5,927 votes.

2011
Results of the 2011 general election held on 15 September 2011:

Votes per municipality:

The following candidates were elected:
 Constituency seats - Pia Adelsteen (O), 9,624 votes; Hans Andersen (V), 1,722 votes; Christine Antorini (A), 19,710 votes; Pia Olsen Dyhr (F), 6,603 votes; Claus Hjort Frederiksen (V), 5,096 votes; Nick Hækkerup (A), 15,091 votes; Sophie Løhde (V), 9,776 votes; Lars Løkke Rasmussen (V), 72,786 votes; Anders Samuelsen (I), 18,472 votes; and Margrethe Vestager (B), 30,376 votes.
 Compensatory seats - Jørgen Arbo-Bæhr (Ø), 3,210 votes; Christian Friis Bach (B), 2,015 votes; and Lars Barfoed (C), 13,577 votes.

2007
Results of the 2007 general election held on 13 November 2007:

Votes per municipality:

The following candidates were elected:
 Constituency seats - Pia Adelsteen (O), 11,091 votes; Pia Christmas-Møller (C), 13,206 votes; Pia Olsen Dyhr (F), 11,439 votes; Claus Hjort Frederiksen (V), 9,950 votes; Nick Hækkerup (A), 23,014 votes; Sophie Løhde (V), 11,160 votes; Lone Møller (A), 13,506 votes; Thor Pedersen (V), 9,946 votes; Lars Løkke Rasmussen (V), 38,375 votes; and Margrethe Vestager (B), 17,947 votes.
 Compensatory seats - Malou Aamund (Y), 9,300 votes; Lars Barfoed (C), 9,280 votes; Klaus Hækkerup (A), 10,146 votes; Marlene Harpsøe (O), 6,096 votes; and Nanna Westerby (F), 7,089 votes.

Notes

References

Folketing constituency
Folketing constituencies
Folketing constituencies established in 2007